The Wales women's national under-18 basketball team is a national basketball team of Wales, administered by the Basketball Wales. It represents the country in women's international under-18 basketball competitions.

The team participated 6 times at the FIBA U18 Women's European Championship Division C and won bronze medals in 2013 and 2015.

See also
Wales women's national basketball team
Wales women's national under-16 basketball team
Wales men's national under-18 basketball team

References

Basketball in Wales
Women's national under-18 basketball teams
Basketball